Gold Star mothers are women entitled to display a gold star on a service flag as the mother, stepmother, adoptive mother or foster mother of a United States Armed Forces member that died while engaged in action against an enemy recognized by the Secretary of Defense.

Gold Star Mothers may also refer to:

American Gold Star Mothers, an organization for Gold Star mothers
Gold Star Mothers National Monument, a proposed national monument commemorating the sacrifices of Gold Star mothers

See also
 Gold Star Lapel Button, United States official decoration for direct next of kin of service members who died in armed hostilities
 Gold Star Fathers Act of 2014, proposed US law to expand preferred eligibility for federal jobs to the fathers of certain disabled or deceased veterans
 Gold Star Wives of America, nonprofit organization supporting spouses and children of service members who died in World War II